Nuno Gomes is a scuba diver who lives in New York City.  Born in Lisbon, his family relocated to Pretoria when he was 14 years old. He is the holder of two world records in deep diving (independently verified and approved by Guinness World Records), the cave diving record from 1996 to the present and the sea water record from 2005 to 2014.

Records 
The dive was done in the Red Sea off the coast of Egypt near Dahab in June 2005. Gomes' total dive time was 12 hours and 20 minutes; the descent took 14 minutes.
He is one of three men verified by Guinness World Records to have dived with scuba equipment (using trimix) below ; the other two divers are the late John Bennett and Ahmed Gabr.

The total dive time was 12 hours and 15 minutes; the descent took 14 minutes with 4 minutes spent at the bottom.

See also 
World's deepest scuba dives

References

External links 
  - official site

Living people
South African people of Portuguese descent
South African underwater divers
Year of birth missing (living people)